The Dream Melody is a 1929 American silent drama film directed by Burton L. King and starring John Roche, Mabel Julienne Scott and Rosemary Theby.

Cast
 John Roche as Richard Gordon 
 Mabel Julienne Scott as Mary Talbot 
 Rosemary Theby as Alicia Harrison 
 Robert D. Walker as George Monroe 
 Adabelle Driver as Nora Flanigan 
 Adolph Faylauer as Signor Malesco 
 Elinor Leslie as Mrs. Chance

References

Bibliography
 Munden, Kenneth White. The American Film Institute Catalog of Motion Pictures Produced in the United States, Part 1. University of California Press, 1997.

External links

1929 films
1929 drama films
Silent American drama films
Films directed by Burton L. King
American silent feature films
1920s English-language films
American black-and-white films
1920s American films